Speiredonia obscura is a species of moth of the family Erebidae first described by Pieter Cramer in 1780.

Distribution
It is found in India, Sri Lanka, Myanmar, Taiwan, the Andamans, Thailand, Cambodia, Vietnam, the Philippines, Palawan, from Sundaland eastwards to Australia, the Bismarck Archipelago, Solomon Islands, Loyalty Islands, New Caledonia, Marianas, western Carolines.

References

External links

Moths described in 1780
Speiredonia